Chwarel Singret is a Site of Special Scientific Interest in the preserved county of Clwyd, north Wales.

See also
List of Sites of Special Scientific Interest in Clwyd

Sites of Special Scientific Interest in Clwyd